The Amsterdam Compiler Kit (ACK) is a retargetable compiler suite and toolchain written by Andrew Tanenbaum and Ceriel Jacobs, since 2005 maintained by David Given. It has frontends for the following programming languages: C, Pascal, Modula-2, Occam, and BASIC.

History
The ACK's notability stems from the fact that in the early 1980s it was one of the first portable compilation systems designed to support multiple source languages and target platforms.

The ACK was known as MINIX's native compiler toolchain until the MINIX userland was largely replaced by that of NetBSD (MINIX 3.2.0) and Clang was adopted as the system compiler.

It was originally closed-source software (that allowed binaries to be distributed for MINIX as a special case), but in April 2003 it was released under the BSD licenses.

Working principle
Maximum portability is achieved by using an intermediate language using bytecode, called EM. Each language front-end produces EM object files, which are then processed through several generic optimisers before being translated by a back-end into native machine code.

ACK comes with a generic linker and librarian capable of manipulating files in the ACK's own a.out-based format; it will work on files containing EM code as well as native machine code. However, EM code cannot be linked to native machine code without translating the EM binary first.

Target processors
ACK backends can produce native machine code for a wide range of CPUs, even starting with small 8 bit CPUs. 
 6502
 6800 (assembler only)
 6805 (assembler only)
 6809 (assembler only)
 ARM
 8080*
 Z80
 Z8000
 Intel 8086*
 i386
 68000
 68020
 68040
 NS32016
 S2650 (assembler only)
 SPARC
 VAX4
 PDP-11
 Broadcom VideoCore IV (BCM2708)*

* Version 6.0

See also
 Portable C compiler

References

External links
 
 Official sourcecode repository, including changelog (GitHub)

BASIC compilers
C (programming language) compilers
Computer science in the Netherlands
Free compilers and interpreters
Information technology in the Netherlands
MINIX
Modula-2 compilers
Pascal (programming language) compilers
Software using the BSD license